Charmy Kaur, also spelt as Charmme or Charmi (born 17 May 1987), is an Indian film producer and former actress. She is well known for her works predominantly in Telugu cinema, as well as few Tamil, Malayalam, Kannada, and Hindi films.  Her most notable works include films such as Mass (2004), Anukokunda Oka Roju (2005), Lakshmi (2006), Pournami (2006), and Rakhi  (2006), where she played supporting roles in all these movies except Anukokunda Oka Roju (2005).

She then appeared in films such as Mantra (2007), for which she won the state Nandi Award for Best Actress, the subsequent years, she appeared in Manorama (2009), Kavya's Diary (2009) and Mangala (2011) for which she garnered another state Nandi Special Jury Award. Later she also appeared in the Hindi film Bbuddah... Hoga Terra Baap alongside  Amitabh Bachchan.

Career
Charmy Kaur made her acting debut in the 2002 Telugu film Nee Thodu Kavali, in which she acted as a housewife at the age of 15. This film was a flop, but helped Charmy in getting noticed by the south Indian film industry. Her next film was T. Rajendar's Kadhal Azhivathillai in Tamil, alongside Silambarasan. During this time she acted in a Malayalam film directed by Vinayan named Kattuchembakam.

Her re-entry to Telugu films happened with Neeke Manasichaanu a film with Srikanth; then in Sri Anjaneyam, directed by Krishna Vamsi, was followed by another drama film Chanti, paired against Ravi Teja. She finally got a big break in Telugu with Gowri, in which she was paired with Sumanth. Again, Charmy paired with Ravi Teja in Dongala Mutha, directed by Ram Gopal Varma. In 2012, she made special appearances in films such as  Dhamarukam, Naayak and Yaare Koogadali. She then appeared in Hindi films such as Zila Ghaziabad and R... Rajkumar. She produced and starred in the film Jyothi Lakshmi (2015), directed by Puri Jagannadh. Her next film, Pratighatana, in which she played a journalist, was her 50th film.

Charmy Kaur co-produced Rogue, starring the debuting Ishan, a Telugu & Kannada bilingual and also Paisa Vasool, starring Nandamuri Bala Krishna, all three movies directed by south Indian star director Puri Jagannadh, who is the core founder of "Puri Connects", a production house along with media related events and marketing and designing and talent management company. She co-produced the film Mehbooba under the Puri Connects Banner along with Puri Jagannadh, who has directed and also co-produced the film on Puri Jagannadh Touring Talkies Banner, launching his son Akash Puri. In May 2019, Charmy Kaur announced she had quit her acting career, and would continue as a film producer.

Filmography

As actress

As producer

Awards
 2005: Santosham Best Actress Award - Anukokunda Oka Roju
 2007: Nandi Award for Best Actress - Mantra

References

External links

 
 

Living people
Indian film actresses
Actresses from Mumbai
Actresses in Telugu cinema
Actresses in Tamil cinema
Actresses in Kannada cinema
Actresses in Malayalam cinema
1987 births
People from Palghar district
Nandi Award winners
Actresses in Hindi cinema
21st-century Indian actresses